Martin Foltýn (born 17 August 1993) is a Czech football player who plays for the B-team of FC Baník Ostrava.

References

External links

1993 births
Living people
Czech footballers
Association football midfielders
FC Baník Ostrava players
FC Hlučín players
Czech First League players